The Privolzhsky constituency (No. 26) is a Russian legislative constituency in Tatarstan. Until 2007 the constituency was based exclusively in Kazan and covered its eastern half; however, after redistricting in 2015 the constituency took more territory in upstate Tatarstan, stretching eastwards to Yelabuga from the Nizhnekamsk constituency; almost half of the former Privolzhsky constituency in urban Kazan was moved to the new Central constituency.

Members elected

Election results

1994

|-
! colspan=2 style="background-color:#E9E9E9;text-align:left;vertical-align:top;" |Candidate
! style="background-color:#E9E9E9;text-align:left;vertical-align:top;" |Party
! style="background-color:#E9E9E9;text-align:right;" |Votes
! style="background-color:#E9E9E9;text-align:right;" |%
|-
|style="background-color:"|
|align=left|Valentin Mikhaylov
|align=left|Independent
|-
|23.9%
|-
| colspan="5" style="background-color:#E9E9E9;"|
|- style="font-weight:bold"
| colspan="4" |Source:
|
|}

1995

|-
! colspan=2 style="background-color:#E9E9E9;text-align:left;vertical-align:top;" |Candidate
! style="background-color:#E9E9E9;text-align:left;vertical-align:top;" |Party
! style="background-color:#E9E9E9;text-align:right;" |Votes
! style="background-color:#E9E9E9;text-align:right;" |%
|-
|style="background-color:"|
|align=left|Sergey Shashurin
|align=left|Independent
|
|24.47%
|-
|style="background-color:"|
|align=left|Aleksandr Saliy
|align=left|Communist Party
|
|17.85%
|-
|style="background-color:#3A46CE"|
|align=left|Valentin Mikhaylov (incumbent)
|align=left|Democratic Choice of Russia – United Democrats
|
|17.46%
|-
|style="background-color:"|
|align=left|Irek Murtazin
|align=left|Independent
|
|7.08%
|-
|style="background-color:#F5A222"|
|align=left|Albert Abdullin
|align=left|Interethnic Union
|
|5.27%
|-
|style="background-color:"|
|align=left|Mikhail Kotovsky
|align=left|Independent
|
|4.03%
|-
|style="background-color:"|
|align=left|Boris Isayev
|align=left|Power to the People
|
|3.97%
|-
|style="background-color:#F5821F"|
|align=left|Nikolay Rybushkin
|align=left|Bloc of Independents
|
|2.32%
|-
|style="background-color:"|
|align=left|Viktor Sedinin
|align=left|Liberal Democratic Party
|
|1.86%
|-
|style="background-color:"|
|align=left|Ivan Stogniyev
|align=left|Independent
|
|1.57%
|-
|style="background-color:#0D0900"|
|align=left|Mufasir Akhunov
|align=left|People's Union
|
|1.31%
|-
|style="background-color:#000000"|
|colspan=2 |against all
|
|8.55%
|-
| colspan="5" style="background-color:#E9E9E9;"|
|- style="font-weight:bold"
| colspan="3" style="text-align:left;" | Total
| 
| 100%
|-
| colspan="5" style="background-color:#E9E9E9;"|
|- style="font-weight:bold"
| colspan="4" |Source:
|
|}

1999

|-
! colspan=2 style="background-color:#E9E9E9;text-align:left;vertical-align:top;" |Candidate
! style="background-color:#E9E9E9;text-align:left;vertical-align:top;" |Party
! style="background-color:#E9E9E9;text-align:right;" |Votes
! style="background-color:#E9E9E9;text-align:right;" |%
|-
|style="background-color:"|
|align=left|Sergey Shashurin (incumbent)
|align=left|Russian All-People's Union
|
|21.08%
|-
|style="background-color:"|
|align=left|Aleksandr Sapogovsky
|align=left|Independent
|
|13.07%
|-
|style="background-color:"|
|align=left|Dmitry Berdnikov
|align=left|Independent
|
|11.56%
|-
|style="background-color:"|
|align=left|Aleksandr Saliy
|align=left|Communist Party
|
|9.73%
|-
|style="background-color:#3B9EDF"|
|align=left|Rafael Mingazov
|align=left|Fatherland – All Russia
|
|8.32%
|-
|style="background-color:"|
|align=left|Insaf Sayfullin
|align=left|Our Home – Russia
|
|6.24%
|-
|style="background-color:"|
|align=left|Rashit Akhmetov
|align=left|Yabloko
|
|4.71%
|-
|style="background-color:"|
|align=left|Valentin Mikhaylov
|align=left|Independent
|
|4.51%
|-
|style="background-color:#1042A5"|
|align=left|Andrey Tatyanchikov
|align=left|Union of Right Forces
|
|4.15%
|-
|style="background-color:#000000"|
|colspan=2 |against all
|
|11.34%
|-
| colspan="5" style="background-color:#E9E9E9;"|
|- style="font-weight:bold"
| colspan="3" style="text-align:left;" | Total
| 
| 100%
|-
| colspan="5" style="background-color:#E9E9E9;"|
|- style="font-weight:bold"
| colspan="4" |Source:
|
|}

2003

|-
! colspan=2 style="background-color:#E9E9E9;text-align:left;vertical-align:top;" |Candidate
! style="background-color:#E9E9E9;text-align:left;vertical-align:top;" |Party
! style="background-color:#E9E9E9;text-align:right;" |Votes
! style="background-color:#E9E9E9;text-align:right;" |%
|-
|style="background-color:"|
|align=left|Airat Khairullin
|align=left|United Russia
|
|31.00%
|-
|style="background:#14589F"| 
|align=left|Ivan Grachyov
|align=left|Development of Enterprise
|
|21.89%
|-
|style="background-color:"|
|align=left|Aleksandr Sapogovsky
|align=left|Independent
|
|9.52%
|-
|style="background-color:"|
|align=left|Aleksandr Saliy
|align=left|Communist Party
|
|7.33%
|-
|style="background-color:"|
|align=left|Aleksandr Grachyov
|align=left|Independent
|
|4.20%
|-
|style="background-color:"|
|align=left|Irek Murtazin
|align=left|Yabloko
|
|4.11%
|-
|style="background-color:"|
|align=left|Sergey Khapugin
|align=left|Independent
|
|1.67%
|-
|style="background-color:"|
|align=left|Vitaly Shashurin
|align=left|Independent
|
|1.39%
|-
|style="background-color:"|
|align=left|Andrey Spirin
|align=left|Liberal Democratic Party
|
|1.31%
|-
|style="background-color:"|
|align=left|Rais Atnagulov
|align=left|Independent
|
|0.99%
|-
|style="background-color:"|
|align=left|Shamil Amirov
|align=left|Independent
|
|0.38%
|-
|style="background-color:#000000"|
|colspan=2 |against all
|
|12.72%
|-
| colspan="5" style="background-color:#E9E9E9;"|
|- style="font-weight:bold"
| colspan="3" style="text-align:left;" | Total
| 
| 100%
|-
| colspan="5" style="background-color:#E9E9E9;"|
|- style="font-weight:bold"
| colspan="4" |Source:
|
|}

2016

|-
! colspan=2 style="background-color:#E9E9E9;text-align:left;vertical-align:top;" |Candidate
! style="background-color:#E9E9E9;text-align:leftt;vertical-align:top;" |Party
! style="background-color:#E9E9E9;text-align:right;" |Votes
! style="background-color:#E9E9E9;text-align:right;" |%
|-
| style="background-color: " |
|align=left|Fatikh Sibagatullin
|align=left|United Russia
|
|70.74%
|-
|style="background-color:"|
|align=left|Rushania Bilgildeyeva
|align=left|A Just Russia
|
|8.85%
|-
|style="background-color:"|
|align=left|Viktor Peshkov
|align=left|Communist Party
|
|7.19%
|-
|style="background-color:"|
|align=left|Lenar Gabdullin
|align=left|Liberal Democratic Party
|
|3.81%
|-
|style="background-color:"|
|align=left|Yevgeny Borodin
|align=left|Rodina
|
|3.14%
|-
|style="background:"| 
|align=left|Dmitry Novikov
|align=left|Communists of Russia
|
|2.83%
|-
|style="background-color:"|
|align=left|Ilya Novikov
|align=left|People's Freedom Party
|
|2.49%
|-
| colspan="5" style="background-color:#E9E9E9;"|
|- style="font-weight:bold"
| colspan="3" style="text-align:left;" | Total
| 
| 100%
|-
| colspan="5" style="background-color:#E9E9E9;"|
|- style="font-weight:bold"
| colspan="4" |Source:
|
|}

2021

|-
! colspan=2 style="background-color:#E9E9E9;text-align:left;vertical-align:top;" |Candidate
! style="background-color:#E9E9E9;text-align:left;vertical-align:top;" |Party
! style="background-color:#E9E9E9;text-align:right;" |Votes
! style="background-color:#E9E9E9;text-align:right;" |%
|-
|style="background-color: " |
|align=left|Ilia Volfson
|align=left|United Russia
|
|62.25%
|-
|style="background-color:"|
|align=left|Fadbir Safin
|align=left|Communist Party
|
|11.05%
|-
|style="background-color:"|
|align=left|Marsel Gabdrakhmanov
|align=left|Liberal Democratic Party
|
|5.51%
|-
|style="background-color:"|
|align=left|Vasily Novikov
|align=left|Communists of Russia
|
|4.87%
|-
|style="background-color:"|
|align=left|Damir Khusnutdinov
|align=left|A Just Russia — For Truth
|
|4.47%
|-
|style="background-color: " |
|align=left|Regina Abdullina
|align=left|Party of Growth
|
|3.57%
|-
|style="background-color: "|
|align=left|Vitaly Gribov
|align=left|Party of Pensioners
|
|2.74%
|-
|style="background-color: " |
|align=left|Eduard Shiverskikh
|align=left|New People
|
|2.27%
|-
|style="background-color: " |
|align=left|Irek Murtazin
|align=left|Yabloko
|
|2.24%
|-
| colspan="5" style="background-color:#E9E9E9;"|
|- style="font-weight:bold"
| colspan="3" style="text-align:left;" | Total
| 
| 100%
|-
| colspan="5" style="background-color:#E9E9E9;"|
|- style="font-weight:bold"
| colspan="4" |Source:
|
|}

Notes

References

Russian legislative constituencies
Politics of Tatarstan